Between the Bridges is the fifth album by Canadian rock band Sloan. The album was recorded in six weeks and was released in 1999 on Murderecords. The album continued the band's progression towards 1970s-influenced rock mixed with 1960s and 70s influenced pop. The album marks a pivotal move forward for the group, expanding on their influences and featured another successful single in their native Canada, "Losing California".

The album's "quick and photocopy looking" cover art was inspired by a black-and-white photo of the movie poster for the 1969 satirical comedy Putney Swope, which band member Jay Ferguson saw in a book.

Critical reception
The A.V. Club wrote that "though many dismissed the album as creatively arrested, its suite-like construction and autobiographical structure makes it Sloan's most fully realized effort." Exclaim! called the album "a pop thrill from start to finish." The Washington Post wrote that "the fact that all four musicians both write and sing gives the sound breadth, yet at no cost to cohesiveness."

Commercial performance
By October 2001, the album had sold 40,000 copies worldwide.

Track listing

Japanese bonus tracks

B-sides
 "Glad to Be Here" (Patrick Pentland/Sloan) (MuchMusic Edgefest 99 compilation)

References

1999 albums
Sloan (band) albums
Murderecords albums